Cayden Primeau (born August 11, 1999) is an American professional ice hockey goaltender. He is currently playing for the Laval Rocket in the American Hockey League (AHL) as a prospect to the Montreal Canadiens of the National Hockey League (NHL). He helped Northeastern win their third Hockey East Tournament in 2019 and received the Mike Richter Award as the National Goaltender of the Year the same season.

Playing career
Primeau was stellar during his brief college career. In his freshman season, he won 19 games and helped Northeastern jump from eighth to second in Hockey East. While the team didn't fare well in the postseason, Primeau was named to the All-Hockey East Rookie Team, First Team and won the conference goaltending title for having the lowest goals against average in league play. The following season, Primeau pushed the Huskies even further, winning a program record 25 games and earning the Tournament MVP when Northeastern won their third Hockey East tournament. Although Northeastern faltered in the NCAA tournament, Primeau was still named an AHCA East First Team All-American and won the Mike Richter Award.

After his sophomore season concluded, Primeau ended his college career by signing an entry-level contract with the Montreal Canadiens.

Personal life
Primeau is the son of former NHL player Keith Primeau, and was born in Farmington Hills, Michigan where his family kept an off-season home when Keith played for the Detroit Red Wings earlier in his career. 

Primeau and his family moved to Voorhees, New Jersey when he was five months old, after his father got traded to the Philadelphia Flyers in January 2000. He is an alumnus of Bishop Eustace Preparatory School.

Career statistics

Regular season and playoffs

International

Awards and honors

References

External links 
 

1999 births
Living people
American men's ice hockey goaltenders
Ice hockey players from Michigan
Laval Rocket players
Lincoln Stars players
Montreal Canadiens draft picks
Montreal Canadiens players
Northeastern Huskies men's ice hockey players
People from Farmington Hills, Michigan
People from Voorhees Township, New Jersey
Sportspeople from Camden County, New Jersey
Bishop Eustace Preparatory School alumni
AHCA Division I men's ice hockey All-Americans